This article describes flora of Turkey that belong to the flowering plant family Apocynaceae.

Apocynaceae
Amsonia  
Amsonia orientalis  
Apocynum  
Apocynum venetum  
Nerium  
Nerium oleander  
Vinca  
Vinca herbacea  
Vinca major  
Vinca major subsp. hirsuta  
Vinca major subsp. major  
Vinca minor

Images

Flora of Turkey